Somos Show, LLC, is a public entertainment company based in Miami, Florida, United States, that focuses in the commercialization and organization of public events (live performances such as concerts, theatre etc.). The company has organized public events in Latin America and the United States. Typical event management includes entertainment, logistics, lighting, promotion, marketing, box office, etc. Somos Show is headed by Luis Villanueva, an international entertainment business executive. SOMOS Show is related to its sister companies SomosTV and Somos Distribution, SOmOS Films SOMOS Films and Somos Productions, all part of SOMOS Group.

History
Starting in 2010, the company launched its first public event Dogs el show de los perros increíbles in Caracas, and Valencia, Venezuela.Dogs el show de los perros increíbles was aimed at families and children, exhibited 30 or more trained dogs in a setting that displayed a mix of humor, music, lights, clowns, etc.

After its first event's success, the company produced with magician Peter Gossamer, "The Ilusionist".

Public events
The firm has managed public events in the Americas with an emphasis on Spanish markets. Somos Show was successful with their first event Dogs. to Caracas, Venezuela; Colombia, Ecuador and Peru. The company has announced that it plans to compete in all industry markets including music, theater, personal appearances, etc.

References

External links

http://www.somostv.net
http://www.somosdistribution.net
http://tuticket.com

Entertainment companies of the United States
Companies based in Miami